A.J. Baime (born July 24, 1971) is an American author, journalist, and public speaker. He is a regular contributor to The Wall Street Journal, and he is best known for his books The Accidental President: Harry S. Truman and the Four Months that Changed the World (2017), Go Like Hell: Ford, Ferrari, and Their Battle for Speed and Glory at Le Mans (2009) and The Arsenal of Democracy: FDR, Detroit, and an Epic Quest to Arm an America at War (2014).

Biography 
Baime was born to Eastern European Jewish parents and raised in suburban New Jersey, where he attended West Essex High School. He earned a B.A. from the University of New Hampshire in 1994, and an M.A. from New York University in 1997. Soon after, he broke into journalism by working as a freelance fact checker at magazines such as GQ, Rolling Stone, and The Village Voice.

In 1998, Baime started his first full-time writing job, at Maxim magazine. Over the next 15 years, he worked at various publications, becoming an executive editor at Boston, Maxim, and Playboy magazines, respectively. During that time, he began writing for other publications, notably The Wall Street Journal, where he currently writes the weekly "My Ride" column, about people who have a passion for a specific kind of automobile or motorcycle.

Baime is known for his work as an automotive journalist; he is a former contributing editor to Road & Track, and he was on the launch team of Time Inc.'s online car magazine TheDrive.

A longtime New Yorker, Baime now lives in northern California, focusing mainly on his work as a book author.

Writings
In 2003, Baime published his first book, Big Shots: the Men Behind the Booze. But his 2009 book Go Like Hell is the one that launched his career as an author. The book covers the Ford vs. Ferrari rivalry to win the 24 Hours of Le Mans in the 1960s. It was developed into the 2019 film Ford v. Ferrari, directed by James Mangold, with Christian Bale and Matt Damon in leading roles.

Baime's 2014 book The Arsenal of Democracy—about the Detroit car companies' contributions to World War II, notably the Ford Motor Company—is also in development for film. Both Go Like Hell and The Arsenal of Democracy won the Ken Purdy Award for best writing in the automotive space (the award is given by the International Motor Press Association).

Film work
Baime has appeared on the TV shows Jay Leno's Garage and One of a Kind: Cars, and he is featured prominently in The 24 Hour War, a feature-length documentary film produced by Adam Carolla and Nate Adams in 2016.

Selected publications 
 Big Shots: The Men Behind the Booze. New York: New American Library, 2003. 
 Go Like Hell: Ford, Ferrari, and Their Battle for Speed and Glory at Le Mans. Boston: Mariner Books, 2010. 
 The Arsenal of Democracy: FDR, Detroit, and an Epic Quest to Arm an America at War. Boston: Mariner Books, Houghton Mifflin Harcourt, 2015, c2014. 
 The Accidental President: Harry S. Truman and the Four Months That Changed the World. Houghton Mifflin Harcourt, 2017. 
 Dewey Defeats Truman:  The 1948 Election and the Battle for America's Soul.  Houghton Mifflin Harcourt, 2020.  
 White Lies: The Double Life of Walter F. White and America's Darkest Secret. Mariner Books, 2022 
 Survival of the Fastest - Weed, Speed, and the 1980's Drug Scandal that Shocked the Sports World with Randy Lanier.  Hachette Books, 2022.

References

External links

"Getting the Tire Tracks on Paper", New York Times, June 8, 2009
Ken Purdy Award Winners, International Motor Press Association

1971 births
American writers

Living people
University of New Hampshire alumni
New York University alumni
People from Essex County, New Jersey
West Essex High School alumni